USMA Stadium is a multi-use stadium in Aïn Bénian, just outside Algiers, Algeria, that is currently under construction. Once completed, it will be used mostly for football matches and will host the home matches of USM Alger. The stadium will have a capacity of 25,000 spectators. It replaces their current stadium Omar Hammadi Stadium.

References

External links
 Announcement of new stadium on USM Alger website

U
Buildings and structures in Algiers Province
Stadiums under construction